Luca Ricci may refer to:

 Luca Ricci (Canadian soccer) (born 1998)
 Luca Ricci (Italian footballer) (born 1989)